West Fallowfield Township is a township in Chester County, Pennsylvania, United States. The population was 2,566 at the 2010 census. It includes the unincorporated village of Cochranville.

History
The Bridge in West Fallowfield Township, Mercer's Mill Covered Bridge, and Joseph and Esther Phillips Plantation are listed on the National Register of Historic Places.

Geography

Demographics

At the 2010 census, the township was 89.7% non-Hispanic White, 1.5% Black or African American, 0.9% Asian, and 1.6% were two or more races. 6.8% of the population were of Hispanic or Latino ancestry.

At the 2000 census there were 2,485 people, 829 households, and 674 families living in the township.  The population density was 137.5 people per square mile (53.1/km2).  There were 858 housing units at an average density of 47.5/sq mi (18.3/km2).  The racial makeup of the township was 96.54% White, 0.93% African American, 0.28% Native American, 0.24% Asian, 1.09% from other races, and 0.93% from two or more races. Hispanic or Latino of any race were 2.29%.

There were 829 households, 39.3% had children under the age of 18 living with them, 70.1% were married couples living together, 7.6% had a female householder with no husband present, and 18.6% were non-families. 15.4% of households were made up of individuals, and 5.3% were one person aged 65 or older.  The average household size was 3.00 and the average family size was 3.32.

The age distribution was 30.3% under the age of 18, 8.3% from 18 to 24, 28.1% from 25 to 44, 22.4% from 45 to 64, and 10.8% 65 or older.  The median age was 35 years. For every 100 females there were 101.1 males.  For every 100 females age 18 and over, there were 97.5 males.

The median household income was $50,833 and the median family income  was $54,940. Males had a median income of $40,566 versus $24,674 for females. The per capita income for the township was $19,853.  About 11.3% of families and 14.8% of the population were below the poverty line, including 22.6% of those under age 18 and 12.6% of those age 65 or over.

Transportation

Pennsylvania Route 10 and Pennsylvania Route 41 are the numbered roads serving West Fallowfield Township. PA 10 follows Limestone Road along a north-south alignment across the southeastern corner of the township. PA 41 follows Gap Newport Pike along a northwest-southeast alignment across the northern and eastern parts of the township.

References

Townships in Chester County, Pennsylvania